The 2010 World Professional Billiards Championship, the top international professional competition in English billiards, was held between 27 and 31 October 2010 at the Northern Snooker Centre in Leeds, England. The 20 players were divided into four groups of five, with the top two in each group advancing into the knock-out round.

Mike Russell won his 10th World Professional Billiards Championship title after beating Dhruv Sitwala 1738–1204 in the final.

Group round

Group A

Group B

Group C

Group D

Knock-out round

References

External links

2010
World Professional Billiards Championship
World Professional Billiards Championship
October 2010 sports events in the United Kingdom
Sports competitions in Leeds
Cue sports in the United Kingdom